Oxprenoate potassium (developmental code name RU-28318) is a synthetic steroidal antimineralocorticoid which was never marketed. The affinities of oxprenoate potassium for the steroid hormone receptors have been reported.

See also
 Oxprenoate

References

Antimineralocorticoids
Carboxylic acids
Ketones
Potassium compounds
Pregnanes
Spirolactones
Tertiary alcohols